Kezang Wangmo is a Bhutanese politician, actress, poet, singer, dancer and goodwill ambassador for organic farming in Bhutan. Kezang was born in Paro District, western part of Bhutan, where she learned to act at her school.

Professional career
Before becoming an actress, Kezang is recognized as a singer from her country, with a hit local-song "A La La Ngi Sem". She starred in various films from her country and rapidly gained fame which brought her to win 2 national awards, including the best newcomer, and best female lead actor for her role in Sem Gi Damtse.

Political career
She joined politics in 2013.

She was elected to the National Assembly of Bhutan as a candidate of People's Democratic Party from Dokar-Sharpa constituency in 2013 Bhutanese National Assembly election. She received 3,571 votes and defeated Chencho Dorji, a candidate of Druk Phuensum Tshogpa.

Filmography

Film

Television

See also

 The Destiny, A Film which Kezang Wangmo also starred in.

References

Year of birth missing (living people)
Bhutanese actresses
Living people
Organic farmers
People's Democratic Party (Bhutan) politicians
Bhutanese women in politics
Bhutanese MNAs 2013–2018